Litku Klemetti (real name Sanna Klemetti, 1987) is a Finnish musician, singer and songwriter influenced by schlager, punk and progressive rock. She started in the indie scene but gained mainstream popularity.

Early life and bands 
Klemetti was born in Kuhmo, in a family she has described as being highly typical. As a young girl she got in touch with the classic albums of progressive rock in her local library, and later began listening to old Finnish schlager artists from cassette tapes. An especially important record for her was We're Only in It for the Money by Mothers of Invention. Klemetti felt highly alienated from other young people, as she didn't know anybody else who listened to progressive rock. During her school years she spent some time in psychiatric ward due to her problems.

After gymnasium, Klemetti studied singing in Orivesi. In 2007, she moved to Jyväskylä where her aunt had lived. She studied at Jyväskylä's Music Conservatorium, but felt that the institution was  excessively rigid for a creative artist. She switched to the department of music science to University of Jyväskylä and graduated in 2015. Her master thesis examined Jyväskylä's indie music scene, especially underground station Radio Hear. Her doctoral studies were left incomplete when demand for gigs increased. Klemetti had been in the bands Jesufåglar, Sateenkaarina, Zorse, and Mäsä as a member, but finally in became bandleader in the band Tuntematon Numero. The band's name was later dropped without line-up changes.

Litku years 
Whereas in her previous bands, like Jesufåglar and Sateenkaarina, she had written progressive or experimental music, she adopted the stage name Litku (a derogatory word for beverages and other liquids) and started to make deliberately simple music. The impetus for making simple rock music had arisen after seeing the live performance of Räjäyttäjät, a band led by Jukka Nousiainen.

When the band's debut album Horror '15 was released in 2016, the music magazine Soundi named her as the new talent of the year. The album was recorded at a local rehearsal place. The album was more influenced by punk, and featured the autobiographical song "Progetyttö" (prog-rock girl).

Her next album Juna Kainuuseen (2017, "train to Kainuu") led to a commercial breakthrough for the wannabe underground star. The title track received large amounts of radio play and the album received an Emma Award in the Critics' Choice category. Klemetti did not find it easy to deal with the sudden burst of attention, and resulting burnout made her consider stopping her career. While the band's name was dropped afterwards, they released a straightforward rock album Päivä päivältä vähemmän ("Less day by day") on the same year. It included the song Danny & Kirka (referring to singers Danny and Kirka) with lyrics being about the fan phenomenon around schlager singers.

Nevertheless, in 2018 Klemetti released the album Taika Tapahtuu ("magic happens"). While the Litku character was initially meant to perform simple music, this album occasionally featured slightly more complex song structures, taking stronger influences from progressive rock and Frank Zappa in particular. Famous songs from the album include "Yöt on unta varten" ("nights are for sleeping") and "Miksi en lähtisi kaupunkiin" ("Why wouldn't I go to the city").

The album Ding Ding Dong was released in the late 2019. The album's lyrical concept follows a fictional character "Hullu Sanna" ("Mad Sanna") which was a name others had called her during her school years. Klemetti has explained that the album's character is what she would have become had she not left her small home town. Stylistically the album is varied, containing more straightforward as well as slightly progressive songs. It has a cleaner sound than its predecessors. Notable songs from the album include "Sinä tiedät sen" (you know it) and "Keijukaisvalssi" ("faery waltz") which has a music video where band members are running in the streets of Kuhmo.

For her 2021 album, Kukkia Muovipussissa ("Flowers in plastic bag"), Klemetti switched style to the 1980s disco (notably inspiration being singer Mona Carita after whom one of the singles from the album is named). Thematically the album is related to the lives of teen girls. Featuring electronic percussions and basslines, the album contains output mostly from Klemetti herself and producer-guitarist Pekka Tuomi, giving a break for the rest of the band. Also album's opening track "Tour de France" was released as a single and video. Another video was made for "Google Earth Rock".

Artistic vision 
Klemetti has stated that she composes very fast, often one album in a week. Her aesthetic vision favors jumble sale clothing and lo-fi sound. She states that she doesn't do "retro" but uses the past as a material to construct new unfashionable things. Her use of the past and abandoned things is done as a counterstatement to the prevailing economic order. 

Klemetti plays keyboards and electric balalaika. Among the most prominent musicians in her band have been Alexi (guitar), Baba-R (bass) and Sammy (drums).

Discography

Albums

Jesufåglar
 Matka Ajan Rannoille, 2010

Zorse
 Zorse (EP), 2012

Sateenkaarina
 Bili Bara Bani Bili (EP), 2015

Mäsä
 Mä&Sä, 2016
 Viimesen Päälle, 2017

Litku Klemetti ja Tuntematon Numero
 Horror '15, 2016
 Päivä päivältä vähemmän, 2017

Litku Klemetti
 Juna Kainuuseen, 2017
 Taika Tapahtuu, 2018
 Ding Ding Dong, 2019
 Kukkia Muovipussissa, 2021
 Asiatonta Oleskelua, 2022

References

External links 
 https://www.luovarecords.com/litkuklemetti
 http://www.facebook.com/litkuyhtye/
 Kangas, Laura: Kaikki hylätty kiinnostaa Litku Klemettiä – vaatteet, vinyylit ja entiset hittibiisit. Jyväskylän ylioppilaslehti 25.9.2017.
 Mattila, Mikael: Kuhmolainen kuvittelija – haastattelussa Litku Klemetti. Rumba 22.1.2018.

1987 births
Living people
People from Kuhmo
Finnish rock musicians
21st-century Finnish women singers
Finnish songwriters
Balalaika players